This is a list of Spanish television related events in 1984.

Events 
 16 January: TV3, Catalonia’s Regional Television channel is launched. It is the second time a Television Network other than the State-owned TVE broadcasts in Spain, after Euskal Telebista.
 5 May: Bravo represent Spain at the Eurovision Song Contest 1984, hold in Luxembourg ranking 3rd with their song Lady, Lady which receives 106 points.

Debuts

Television shows

La 1

Ending this year

La 1

Foreign series debuts in Spain

Births 
 24 January - Belén Cuesta, actress
 3 February -
 Sara Carbonero, journalist
 Silvia Laplana, meteorologist
 15 June - Javier Hernández, actor
 18 June - Sara Rancaño, journalist
 22 June - José Yélamo, journalist
 24 June - Javier Ambrossi, actor, producer and director
 6 July - Andrea Ropero, journalist
 14 July - Adriana Abenia, actress & hostess.
 30 July - Marco Martínez, actor
 16 August - Sofía Nieto, actress
 18 August - David Carrillo, actor & host
 20 October - Elio González, actor
 28 December - Maggie Civantos, actress
 30 December - David Broncano, host
 Cristina Cruz Mínguez, actress
 Sara Rancaño, journalist

Deaths 
 13 April - Mary Delgado, actress, 67
 23 August - Héctor Quiroga, journalist, 51
 10 September - Ismael Merlo, actor, 66

See also
 List of Spanish films of 1984

References 

1984 in Spanish television